Stenopa is a genus of tephritid or fruit flies in the family Tephritidae.

Species
Stenopa affinis Quisenberry, 1949
Stenopa mexicana Norrbom, 2010
Stenopa vulnerata (Loew, 1873)

References

Tephritinae
Tephritidae genera
Diptera of North America